This is a list of notable rail accidents in Thailand.

Before 2000s 

 1 August 1979: Ordinary Train No.165 approached the switch in Taling Chan Junction yard and collided with a freight train from Bang Sue Junction, having gone through a red signal. 51 people were killed and 138 injured. It remains Thailand's worst railway disaster.
 8 November 1986: 6 runaway, unmanned, coupled locomotives which had their engines left on due to maintenance works at Bang Sue Depot collided at Bangkok railway station, killing 4 and injuring 4.
 23 May 1989: Rapid Train No.38 collided with an overhanging cliff between Pang Puai railway station, Lampang Province and Pha Khan railway station, Phrae Province. 8 carriages fell off the mountainside, resulting in 8 people killed and 139 injured.
 26 June 1998: Rapid Train No. 38 collided with an overhanging cliff between Pha Khan railway station and Ban Pin railway station, Phrae Province. 3 people were killed with an unspecified number of injuries.

2000s 
 17 January 2005: (Bangkok) 140 injured passengers, resulting from a collision of two metro trains on the newly-opened MRT Blue Line.
 5 October 2009:  A passenger train derailed in Hua Hin at 04:50 local time (21:50 on October 4 UTC). At least seven people were killed and dozens were injured. Occurred during rainstorm.
 Train crashes into pick-up truck at railroad crossing in Prachuap Khiri Khan. One dead, two injured.

2010s 
 6 April 2013: Ordinary Train No.202 derailed near Lak Si railway station, Bangkok due suspected rail fastening spike theft. There were no casualties.
 26 March 2015: Rapid Train No.107 collided with Express Train No.69 near Ban Don Klang railway halt, Phra Nakhon Si Ayutthaya Province, injuring more than 40 people.
 8 January 2016: Ordinary Train No.255 collided with a runaway cattle truck at a level crossing between Phetchaburi railway station and Khao Thamon railway station, Phetchaburi Province, killing 3 and injuring 34.
 3 April 2016: Excursion Train No.909 collided with a bus at a level crossing near Wat Ngiu Rai railway station, Nakhon Pathom Province, killing 3 and injuring 27.
 1 March 2018: Express Train No.83 derailed over a curve between Huai Yot railway station and Trang railway station, Trang Province. There were no casualties.
 1 March 2018: Freight Train No.1552 derailed over a railway switch at Bang Klam railway station, Songkhla Province. There were no casualties.

2020s  
 24 February 2020: Thaksin Express No.37/45 collided with Freight Train No.722 at Pak Tho railway station, Ratchaburi Province. 42 people were injured.
 10 July 2020: Ordinary Train No. 201 derailed over a railway switch at Ban Mai railway station, Phitsanulok Province. There were no casualties.
 11 October 2020: Freight Train No.852 collided with a bus at a level crossing near Khlong Khwaeng Klan railway halt, Chachoengsao Province. 19 passengers on the bus were killed and 40 were injured.
 2 January 2022: Rapid Train No.172 derailed over a railway switch at Rueso railway station, Narathiwat Province. There were no casualties.
31 January 2022: Rapid Train No.134 collided with a truck trailer at a railway crossing near Nong Khon Kwang railway station, Udon Thani Province. 2 train crew were killed.

See also 
 List of rail accidents by country

References 

Rail accidents
Thailand
Railway accidents and incidents in Thailand